The UST Lady Booters football team represents the University of Santo Tomas in the University Athletic Association of the Philippines (UAAP) football tournament. UST has made 11 Finals appearances and won two championships since the women's football tournament began in the league in 1995. Their head coach as of August 9, 2015 is former Lady Booter Aging Rubio.

UST also participates in the PFF Women's League and the UNIGAMES during summer and the off-season months.

History

Inaugural season
The UST Lady Booters joined the inaugural five-team UAAP Women's football tournament that began on November 30, 1995. They lost their opening match against UP, 1–2 with L. Cruz scoring the goal for UST. They got back at UP by winning, 1–0 in their second round match on January 17, 1996, through Mary Ann Manzano's goal. The other UST players who scored in the season were Siegfried Rockwell and Jonalyn Evangelista.

Seasons under Talavera and Bejemino
The team had respectable finishes in their first two years, but had fallen to fifth and last in the standings in 1997. Former UST Golden Booter Gil Talavera was then appointed head coach in 1998. He guided UST to the Finals the following year in Season 62, but had to settle for a third-place finish in Season 63. The Lady Booters reached the Finals again in Season 65 but fell short against La Salle for the second time, surrendering a wide margin of 1–5. Joyce Landagan scored the lone goal for the Lady Booters to prevent a shutout by the eventual champions.

Talavera resigned at the end of Season 66 after another third-place finish by the Lady Booters and was replaced by his long-time assistant Jade Bejemino, who was also a former Lady Booter. Moving on from the team with the former coach were their leading scorers, Alelie Bonifacio who has used up her five-year playing eligibility; and Landagan who was left out of the roster due to academic deficiencies.

In Bejemino's first year as coach, the team struggled in the first round with only a single win against two draws and a loss. That win came in their opening match of the season against Ateneo's Lady Blue Guards. Julie Ann Gerona scored a goal to add to two others made by rookie Dorelyn Mendaza for a 3–0 finish. They were able to catch up in the next round to duplicate Season 66's third-place finish with four wins against two draws and two losses.

The Lady Booters made a return trip to the Finals in Season 68, but lost yet again to La Salle, 1–2. Mary Ignacio won the Rookie of the Year award for the season.

With La Salle's suspension in Season 69 and having to contend with only three other teams, UST reached the Finals again but became unsuccessful yet again when they lost the title to FEU. They have had four attempts so far in claiming the championship and all of them have resulted to runner-up finishes.

The following year gave the Lady Booters an auspicious start, having finally won the UNIGAMES and the Metro Manila Girls Football Association crowns in the offseason. The best finish that they got before in the MMGFA was third beginning in 2001, and they had back-to-back second-place finishes in the UNIGAMES in 2003 and 2004. They were also runners-up in the inaugural Ang Liga Filipina tournament in 2006. They ended their UAAP Season 70 campaign at third place with four wins against two draws and two losses.

Seasons under Estrabon
Bejemino stepped down in 2008 and was replaced by Bon Estrabon who went on to lead the team to their first UAAP women's football title in Season 71. UST defeated La Salle on a 4–1 penalty shootout after both teams were tied, 1–1 at the end of regulation. The Lady Booters were actually behind on points until Aiza Mondero made the equalizer at the 75th minute. In overtime, UST's Shiralyn Francisco and Jovelyn Artillaga's penalty kicks went through Hannah Ibarra's guard. La Salle's Karla Pacificador's shot went in next, but misfires from Clarissa Lazaro and Samantha Nierras kept the score at 2–1. Two more successful goals by team captain Aprilyn Reyes and Joma Clemente sealed the win for UST. Mary Ignacio was named MVP of the season, while Marianne Narciso won the Rookie of the year award. Louella Amamuyo was named Best defender and Irish Rapal got the Best goalkeeper award.

The Lady Booters once again won the UNIGAMES in 2009 to add to their MMGFA title which they also won that year where they defeated La Salle in both matches. The two teams met again in Season 72's football Finals with La Salle holding a twice-to-beat advantage. UST won, 2–0, both on Marianne Narciso's goals to extend the series. They then lost in the second match, 0–1 when Nikki Regalado failed to score at the end of regulation. Narciso, who was also held scoreless by their opponents, received the Best striker award with a season-high total of nine goals scored in the tournament. Arlene Gavile was named Best goalkeeper of the season.

After a back-to-back Finals affair with La Salle, the Lady Booters once again faced FEU after topping the eliminations with a 5–1–2 win–draw–loss record. While expecting to have a twice-to-beat advantage over their opponents, the UAAP board decided to make the championship into a best-of-three series. FEU won the first match on a 2–0 penalty shootout, but UST made a comeback with a 1–0 win to extend the series. Jowe-Ann Barruga converted a successful header from a corner shot in the 15th minute. FEU had a chance to equalize in the second half when a UST defender was called for a handball violation, but Kristia Sabanal missed the penalty when her shot bounced off the post. Coach Estrabon's team was not as successful in the third and deciding match after they yielded the championship on a 0–1 loss to FEU. Zipporah Luna, the Lady Booters' goalkeeper could not stop FEU's Frea Fado from scoring early in the 16th minute, however, Luna still won the Best goalkeeper award for the season. Marianne Narciso was again named Best striker with four goals scored in the season, and Pearl Anjanette Aguilar was given the Rookie of the year award.

UST won the title again in Season 74 over La Salle, who had returned to the Finals after getting eliminated the past year. The Lady Booters, for their part, were coming off back-to-back Finals losses to La Salle in Season 72; and to FEU last season. Jowe-Ann Barruga scored a goal in the 67th minute for the 1–0 win in the deciding match against La Salle. Teammate Christine Fuertes made the pass for the title-clinching goal. Barruga played on after incurring a cut on her head from a collision with La Salle defender Celine Ampil. The Lady Booters held a twice-to-beat advantage, but their opponents forced a deciding game with a 4–3 penalty shootout win. This was Estrabon's as well as UST's second championship in the UAAP since the sports debuted in 1995. Marice Magdolot was named MVP and Marianne Narciso won the Best striker award for the third straight year. Aiza Mondero also won an award as the Best midfielder of the season.

The Lady Booters failed to qualify to the Finals in Season 75. They lost to FEU, 0–1 in the second round for a third-place finish in the standings with three wins, two draws and three losses.

Seasons under Judal
JR Judal replaced Bon Estrabon as coach in August 2013. In his first year, the new mentor emphasized ball passing as key to the team's offense. The Lady Booters began Season 76 on a goalless draw with Ateneo, with Judal attributing the outcome to inexperience by the team's many rookies. UST went on to top the eliminations at first place with three wins, four draws and one loss in the standings. Having a twice-to-beat advantage in the Finals, they bowed down twice to FEU with 0–1 and 1–2 losses. Marice Magdolot made the lone goal in the second match on the 89th minute, while still trailing their opponents by 1. Jena Abuan was named Best defender while Zipporah Luna again won the Best goalkeeper award.

Seasons under Rubio
From being runners-up in Season 76, the Lady Booters struggled and ended last in the standings with a 2–0–6 win–draw–loss record. Aging Rubio who was a player on UST's 2008 champion team replaced JR Judal as coach after only two seasons. The 2014 team was disbanded after Judal's resignation. Rubio's first official coaching assignment came in the offseason when UST joined the 2015 PFF Women's Cup. She was the coach of Saint Pedro Poveda College, as well as UST's men and women's futsal team prior to her appointment as the Lady Booters' head coach.

The Lady Booters began their Season 78 campaign with a loss to La Salle, 3–5. Charisa Lemoran, Jennizel Cabalan and Niña Acuña scored each of the goals. They ended up fifth and last in the standings for the second straight year with a 1–1–6 W–D–L record. Their lone win came in the first round when they defeated FEU, 3–2. Lemoran scored two goals and Cabalan added one. They also held FEU to a scoreless draw in the second round. Former team captain Chanda Solite was named to the Mythical team during the awarding ceremonies.

In Season 79, UST was once again in the Finals following two consecutive disappointing seasons. They defeated Ateneo, 5–4 in a playoff match to determine La Salle's Finals opponent. Their first round match against Ateneo ended in a 2–2 draw where they twice came back from a 0–1 and 1–2 deficit. They fell short of the title after yielding a 1–3 loss to La Salle, but four of their players ended up bagging awards with Charisa Lemoran, Aira Ilan, and Hazel Lustan being named to the Mythical team and Mary Joy Indac winning the Rookie of the year award. Lustan made the lone goal in the match from a six-yard kick in the 73rd minute of the match.

The Lady Booters were the first to reach the Finals in Season 80 when they defeated defending champions La Salle, 5–2. Charisa Lemoran and Shelah Cadag scored two goals apiece with Mary Joy Indac adding a fifth for the match. They also won in the first round on a 1–0 score. La Salle still made it to the Finals and defeated UST for the second straight year. The match ended in a 1–2 score with Shelah Cadag making the lone goal in the 22nd minute. Shelah Cadag was named Best striker of the season and UST was given the Fair Play award.

In Season 81, UST lost to UP, 0–1 and were eliminated from the Finals. The Lady Booters ended the season in third place with a 6–1–1 W–D–L record. UP finished with a lower rank due to an inferior goal difference.

The football games for the senior men and women's tournament in Season 82 were cancelled due to the COVID-19 pandemic. The Lady Booters played only one game in a 0–1 losing effort to UP. Carmela Sacdalan, who replaced the already-graduated Nicole Reyes as the team's goalkeeper, failed to stop the penalty goal from UP's Stacey Arthur in the 35th minute.

Succession of team captains

Succession of head coaches

Year-by-year results

UAAP Eliminations history

UAAP Finals history

Philippine Football Federation tournament results

Players and staff

Roster
as of 25 Feb 2023

Coaching staff
as of 25 Feb 2023

Notable players

National team appearances

 Prescila Rubio
2011 AFF Women's Championship
 Maria Dorelyn Mendaza
2011 AFF Women's Championship
 Marie Magdolot
2012 AFF Women's Championship
 Nikki Regalado
2011, 2012 AFF Women's Championships
 Jane Mariz Pacaña
2011, 2012 AFF Women's Championships
 Zipporah Luna
2011, 2012 AFF Women's Championships
 Joma Clemente
2011, 2012 AFF Women's Championships
 Jowe-Ann Barruga
2011, 2012 AFF Women's Championships
 Rachel Hope Sanchez
2015 AFF Women's Championship
 Pearl Anjanette Aguilar
2011 AFC U-19 Women's Championship
2013, 2015 AFF Women's Championships

 Aiza Mondero
2011, 2015 AFF Women's Championships
2012 AFF Women's Championship (captain)
2013 Southeast Asian Games
 Marianne Narciso
2013, 2015 AFF Women's Championships
 Marice Magdolot
2012, 2013, 2015 AFF Women's Championships
 Jennizel Cabalan
2013, 2015, 2016 AFF Women's Championships
 Nicole Julliane Reyes
2018 AFF Women's Championship
 Hazel Lustan
2019 Southeast Asian Games
 Charisa Marie Lemoran
2017, 2019 Southeast Asian Games
2018, 2019 AFF Women's Championships
 Shelah Mae Cadag
2019 Southeast Asian Games
2020 AFC Women's Olympic Qualifying

Honors

Team

UAAP
Champions: 
Runners-up: 
Fair Play award: 2018
PFF Women's League
Runners-up: 
UNIGAMES
Champions: 
Runners-up: 
Metro Manila Girls Football Association
Champions: 

Rexona Cup
Champions: 
PFL Ang Liga Filipina
Champions: 2013
Runners-up: 2006
Pinay in Action (PIA) Cup
Champions: 2018
Runners-up: 2019
Brent Invitational
Champions: 2003

Individual

Joyce Landagan
2000 UAAP Best Striker
Mary Cres Ignacio
2005 UAAP Rookie of the Year
2008 UAAP MVP
Louella Leah Amamuyo
2006 UAAP Rookie of the Year
2008 UAAP Best Defender
Jade Bejemino
2006 UAAP Coach of the Year
Marianne Narciso
2008 UAAP Rookie of the Year
2009, 2010, 2011 UAAP Best Striker
Irish Jane Rapal
2008 UAAP Best Goalkeeper
Arlene May Gavile
2009 UAAP Best Goalkeeper
Pearl Anjannete Aguilar
2010 UAAP Rookie of the Year
Zipporah Luna
2010, 2013 UAAP Best Goalkeeper
Marice Magdolot
2011 UAAP MVP

Aiza Mondero
2011 UAAP Best Midfielder
Jena Abuan
2013 UAAP Best Defender
Chanda Solite
2016 UAAP Mythical team
Charisa Marie Lemoran
2016 PFF Best Midfielder
2017 UAAP Mythical team
Ivy Lopez
2016 PFF Best Defender
Hazel Lustan
2017 UAAP Mythical team
2018 PFF Best Midfielder
Aira Ilan
2017 UAAP Mythical team
Mary Joy Indac
2017 UAAP Rookie of the Year
Shelah Mae Cadag
2018 UAAP Best Striker
2019 PFF Best Midfielder

Past rosters

Footnotes

References

University of Santo Tomas
University Athletic Association of the Philippines football teams
Women's football clubs in the Philippines
PFF Women's League clubs